Tympanocryptis fictilis, the harlequin earless dragon, is a species of agama found in Australia.

References

fictilis
Agamid lizards of Australia
Taxa named by Jane Melville
Taxa named by Mark Norman Hutchinson
Reptiles described in 2019